Lazarevsky (masculine), Lazarevskaya (feminine), or Lazarevskoye (neuter) is the name of several inhabited localities in Russia.

Modern rural localities
Lazarevsky (rural locality), a settlement in Lazarevskaya Rural Administration of Gorodovikovsky District in the Republic of Kalmykia; 
Lazarevskoye (rural locality), a village in Yuryev-Polsky District of Vladimir Oblast
Lazarevskaya, Kargopolsky District, Arkhangelsk Oblast, a village in Lodyginsky Selsoviet of Kargopolsky District in Arkhangelsk Oblast
Lazarevskaya, Verkhnetoyemsky District, Arkhangelsk Oblast, a village in Novovershinsky Selsoviet of Verkhnetoyemsky District in Arkhangelsk Oblast

Abolished inhabited localities
Lazarevskoye, a former resort settlement in Krasnodar Krai; merged into the city of Sochi in 1961 as Lazarevskoye Microdistrict

See also
Lazar (disambiguation)
Lazarev
Lazarevski